A special election was held in  August 24, 1801 to fill a vacancy caused by the resignation of Levi Lincoln Sr. (DR) on March 5, 1801, before the first session of Congress, upon being appointed U.S. Attorney General.

Election results
Massachusetts electoral law required a majority for election, which was not met on the June 22, 1801 first ballot, requiring a second election held on August 24.

Hastings took his seat on January 11, 1802.

See also
List of special elections to the United States House of Representatives

References

United States House of Representatives 1801 04
Massachusetts 1801 04
Massachusetts 1801 04
1801 04
Massachusetts 04
United States House of Representatives 04